Jackson Township is one of four townships in Brown County, Indiana. As of the 2010 census, its population was 4,002 and it contained 2,112 housing units.

History
Jackson Township was named for Andrew Jackson.

Geography

Unincorporated towns
 Beanblossom
 Bear Wallow
 Cornelius
 Fruitdale
 Helmsburg
 Lanam
 Needmore
 Trevlac
 Waycross
(This list is based on USGS data and may include former settlements.)

Adjacent townships
 Hamblen (east)
 Washington (south)
 Benton Township, Monroe County (west)
 Hensley Township, Johnson County (northeast)
 Washington Township, Morgan County (northwest)

Major highways
  Indiana State Road 45
  Indiana State Road 135

Cemeteries
The township contains two cemeteries: Georgetown and Lanam.

References
 
 United States Census Bureau cartographic boundary files

External links

 Indiana Township Association
 United Township Association of Indiana

Townships in Brown County, Indiana
Townships in Indiana